Kapcherop is a town and administrative division of Elgeyo-Marakwet County, Kenya. Prior to March 2013, it was located in the Marakwet District, Rift Valley Province.

The administrative division had a population of 39,328 in 1999.

The town is the birthplace of Kenyan runner Ismael Kirui.

References

Populated places in Rift Valley Province